Nicole da Silva (born 18 September 1981) is an Australian actress, best known for her roles as Stella Dagostino in the series Rush (2008–2011), and as Franky Doyle in the show Wentworth (2013–2018, 2019). She has made appearances in series such as Carla Cametti PD (2009) and Doctor Doctor (2016–2021).

Early life and education
Nicole da Silva was born on 18 September 1981 in Sydney. Her family is from Portugal and she has family living in Portugal and Brazil. She obtained her Bachelor of Arts at University of Western Sydney (UWS) Nepean, now known as Western Sydney University.

Career
Da Silva's first on-screen credit came in the Seven Network medical drama show All Saints, in which she played Sasha Fernandez for 11 episodes in 2005. That part helped in securing her future roles, so in 2007, da Silva played Erica 'EC' Eulestra in the Fox8 series Dangerous, a role that got her a Logie Award nomination, for story of forbidden love, set in Sydney's culturally diverse backgrounds.

Da Silva gained notable recognition in the Network Ten police drama series Rush, in which she appeared in all 70 episodes in four seasons as Stella Dagostino in the story based on the real-life Victoria Police Critical Incident Response Team, something similar to the SWAT in the US, with the plot exploring both the personal and working lives of the team. In the meantime, da Silva played one of the main roles as Lisa Testro in the show Carla Cametti PD (2009) for six episodes, but the series was cancelled after just one season.

Da Silva is probably best known for her role in the SoHo TV drama series Wentworth, in which she appeared for 55 episodes from 2013 to 2018 as Franky Doyle, a character played by Carol Burns in the original classic Network Ten show Prisoner, which aired from 1979 to 1986. Franky is in Wentworth correctional facility, a tough lesbian inmate battling against fellow inmate Jacs Holt for the position of top dog. Da Silva played this role in the first six seasons of the series, and in the opening three seasons her character was a central role before being released at the end of the third season, however, she did return for a limited supporting role in the fourth season, and again for the fifth season when Franky is wrongly imprisoned for murder and tries to prove her innocence. The first three episodes of the sixth season conclude her story before she left the series in 2018. This role got da Silva the ASTRA Award for the Most Outstanding Performance by an Actor (Female) in 2014, and several other nominations.

In 2015, da Silva made her big-screen debut as Nana in Sophie Mathisen's romantic comedy Drama, starring Agnès Boury, Julien Bravo and Jonathan Burteaux. In 2016, while working on Wentworth, da Silva was cast for the role of Charlie Knight in the Nine Network medical drama show Doctor Doctor, in the story of a rising heart surgeon's life and his problems that converted him from a big-city doctor into a small-town doctor. She appeared in all five seasons of the show.

da Silva and Wentworth co-star Danielle Cormack started the production company FourOneOne, and have produced the play 'Whose Afraid' in 2022.

In 2023 da Silva was announced for upcoming drama One Night alongside Yael Stone, Jodie Whittaker, Tina Bursill and more.

Personal life 
In February 2014, she was announced as the first National Champion of UN Women Australia, for which she supported women's empowerment and gender equality at events around the country.

In April 2018, da Silva announced that she and her partner John were expecting their first child, and gave birth to a daughter in July 2018.

Filmography

Awards

References

External links

 
 
 
 Rush Official Website: Cast – Nicole da Silva
 Nicole da Silva on TV.com
 Nicole da Silva Actress Biography

Living people
Australian television actresses
Australian people of Portuguese descent
Australian film actresses
Australian stage actresses
Actresses from Sydney
Western Sydney University alumni
1981 births
21st-century Australian actresses